Romerus hainanus is a species of frog in the family Rhacophoridae. It is endemic to the Hainan Island, China, and only known from its type locality, Mount Diaoluo in Lingshui Li Autonomous County.

Romerus hainanus resembles Romerus ocellatus. Little is known about this newly described species. It has been recorded from bushes and bamboo forests at mid-altitudes (about  asl). It is likely negatively affected by habitat degradation and deforestation caused by smallholder farming and wood extraction.

References

hainanus
Amphibians of China
Endemic fauna of Hainan
Taxonomy articles created by Polbot
Amphibians described in 2004